Athletics was contested at the 1966 Asian Games in Bangkok, Thailand from December 10 to December 15.

Medalists

Men

Women

Medal table

References
Asian Games Results. GBR Athletics. Retrieved on 2014-10-04.
Women's relay medallists. Incheon2014. Retrieved on 2014-10-04.
Men's relay medallists. Incheon2014. Retrieved on 2014-10-04.

 
1966 Asian Games events
1966
Asian Games
Asian Games 1966